In recreational mathematics, a ban number is a number that does not contain a particular letter when spelled out in English; in other words, the letter is "banned." Ban numbers are not precisely defined, since some large numbers do not follow the standards of number names (such as googol and googolplex).

There are several published sequences of ban numbers:
 The aban numbers do not contain the letter A. The first few aban numbers are 1 through 999, 1,000,000 through 1,000,999, 2,000,000 through 2,000,999, ... The word "and" is not counted.
 The eban numbers do not contain the letter E. The first few eban numbers are 2, 4, 6, 30, 32, 34, 36, 40, 42, 44, 46, 50, 52, 54, 56, 60, 62, 64, 66, 2000, 2002, 2004, ... . The sequence was coined in 1990 by Neil Sloane. Coincidentally, all the numbers in the sequence are even.
 The iban numbers do not contain the letter I. The first few iban numbers are 1, 2, 3, 4, 7, 10, 11, 12, 14, 17, 20, 21, 22, 23, 24, 27, 40, ... . Since all -illion numbers contain the letter I, there are exactly 30,275 iban numbers, the largest being 777,777.
 The oban numbers do not contain the letter O. The first few oban numbers are 3, 5, 6, 7, 8, 9, 10, 11, 12, 13, 15, 16, 17, 18, 19, 20, 23, 25, 26, ... . Since "thousand" and all the -illion numbers contain the letter O, there are exactly 454 oban numbers, the largest being 999.
 The tban numbers do not contain the letter T. The first few tban numbers are 1, 4, 5, 6, 7, 9, 11, 100, 101, 104, 105, 106, 107, 109, 111, 400, 401, 404, 405, 406, ... .
 The uban numbers do not contain the letter U. The first few uban numbers are 1, 2, 3, 5, 6, 7, 8, 9, 10, 11, 12, 13, 15, 16, 17, 18, 19, 20, 21, 22, 23, 25, 26, ... .

Basic properties

Aban numbers
 For 1<N<109, aban numbers are numbers which the integer part of N/1000 is divisible by 1000.

Eban numbers
 Eban numbers are even, due to "one", "three", "five", "seven", "nine", "eleven" and the suffix -teen all containing 'e's.

Further reading

External links
 
 
 
 
 

Integer sequences